John Walters may refer to:
 John Walters (poet) (1760–1789), priest and poet, son of the Welsh cleric of same name
 John Walters (Welsh cleric) (c. 1721–1797), Welsh priest and lexicographer
 Sir Tudor Walters (John Tudor Walters, 1868–1933), British politician
 John Walters (broadcaster) (1939–2001), British producer
 John Walters (cricketer) (born 1949), British cricketer
 John Walters (lawyer) (born 1956), Namibian ombudsman
 John Walters (rower) (born 1963), American who competed at the 1988 Summer Olympics
 John Walters, American sports broadcaster for the Iowa State Cyclones
 John L. Walters (born c. 1960s), British musician and journalist
 Jonathan Walters (born 1983), Irish footballer
 John P. Walters (born 1952), American academic and government administrator
 Johnnie Walters (fl. late 20th century), Canadian-born broadcaster
 J. Reed Walters, politician and an attorney from Louisiana
 John Walters (ship), a schooner that sunk in 1883

See also
John Stagikas (born 1979), American professional wrestler who wrestles as "Hurricane" John Walters
John Walter (disambiguation)
John Waters (disambiguation)